Sense: A Cyberpunk Ghost Story is an indie survival horror game released in 2020 for Microsoft Windows and macOS, in 2021 for Nintendo Switch, PlayStation 4 and PlayStation Vita, and in 2022 for Xbox One. The game features a blend of Chinese folklore and Cyberpunk themes, while drawing gameplay inspiration from the Fatal Frame and Clock Tower franchises.

Gameplay
The world can be explored via pointing and clicking to reveal elements and solve puzzles. The main character has cybernetic ocular implants, which allow for zooming in on important areas for a closer look.

Plot
Set in 2083, Neo Hong Kong, heroine Mei-Lin Mak must explore the ruins of Chong Sing Apartments, discovering the history of its 14 lost souls, as well as her own family's past.

Release
The game was released for Windows via Steam August 25, 2020, but temporarily pulled the next day for bug fixes and difficulty tweaks.

Controversy 
Following the game's release on Switch, Top Hat Studios released a statement indicating they would not censor the game, despite receiving calls on social media to censor the game and death threats relating to the game's art style. Though TheGamer questioned whether the statement was instead a manufactured controversy, noting the game received an influx of reviews following the statement, most of which they said were from people who barely played the game, and which contained statements in opposition to "social justice warriors." The Gamer also argued that the art-style present in the game is outdated and that therefore criticism of it is justified. Top Hat Studios responded to the article by TheGamer, ResetEra, and other venues, addressing the accusations of manufactured controversy by providing screenshots of these threats in a Twitter post.

Reception 

On Metacritic the Switch version game holds a 55 rating based on 7 reviews indicating "mixed or average reviews". In a review for the PC version for Noisy Pixel Azario Lopez said the game was "a call back to classic survival horror adventures that seemed to cater so much to the developer's needs that it left out the most important part: The player" and that "The story will rarely make sense, and the haphazard nature of the puzzle design force many moments of aimless backtracking." While Cubed3 said in a review of the PC version "fails as an adventure game." While Finger Guns said in a review of the Switch version that "For a game about spirits, Sense: A Cyberpunk Ghost Story is pretty soulless. A by-the-numbers backtracking horror game in the vein of Clock Tower its structure and content feel lackluster and a little disappointing if you went in expecting cyberpunk themes."

References

External links
Official Site

2020 video games
Nintendo Switch games
PlayStation 4 games
PlayStation Vita games
Point-and-click adventure games
2020s horror video games
Video games about ghosts
Video games developed in the United States
Video games featuring female protagonists
Video games set in Hong Kong
Single-player video games
Cyberpunk video games
Windows games
Fiction set in 2083
Obscenity controversies in video games
Video games set in the 2080s